Souzy-la-Briche is a commune in the Essonne department in Île-de-France, northern France.

Inhabitants of Souzy-la-Briche are known as Souzéens.

See also
Communes of the Essonne department

References

External links

Mayors of Essonne Association 

Communes of Essonne